Fresh Wind from Canada is a 1935 German comedy film directed by Erich Holder and starring Max Gülstorff, Dorit Kreysler and Paul Hörbiger. It was shot at the Babelsberg Studios in Potsdam outside Berlin. The film's sets were designed by the art director Erich Kettelhut and Max Mellin.

Cast
 Max Gülstorff as J. N. Granitz
 Dorit Kreysler as Karin, seine Tochter
 Paul Hörbiger as Meinkel, Angestellter Modehaus Granitz
 Oskar Sima as Bernetzki, Angestellter Modehaus Granitz
 Blandine Ebinger as Lore Hartwig, Angestellte Modehaus Granitz
 Jakob Tiedtke as Henry Baker
 Harald Paulsen as Jonny, sein Sohn
 Leopoldine Konstantin as Frau Olden
 Hans Brausewetter as Sven, ihr Sohn
 Aribert Wäscher as Christian Fr. Schulze
 Grethe Weiser as Margot
 Oscar Sabo as Mackie, Box-Trainer
 Werner Finck as Bauer, Photograph
 Annemarie Korff
 Genia Nikolaieva
 Hans Richter as Page
 Ursula Schlettow
 Annemarie Steinsieck
 Hugo Werner-Kahle

References

Bibliography

External links 
 

1935 films
1935 comedy films
German comedy films
Films of Nazi Germany
1930s German-language films
Films directed by Erich Holder
Films about fashion
UFA GmbH films
German black-and-white films
Films shot at Babelsberg Studios
1930s German films